Ludgério de Almeida Santiago da Silva (born 14 August 1986) is a São Tomean retired footballer who played as a midfielder. He also holds Portuguese citizenship.

Silva has previously played for Infesta, Progresso, União Nogueirense, Padroense and Paços de Ferreira.

International career

International goals
Scores and results list São Tomé and Príncipe's goal tally first.

References

External links 
 
 

1986 births
Living people
People from Lobata District
São Tomé and Príncipe footballers
F.C. Infesta players
Padroense F.C. players
C.F. União players
F.C. Bravos do Maquis players
C.D. Cinfães players
S.C. Coimbrões players
S.C. Covilhã players
São Tomé and Príncipe international footballers
São Tomé and Príncipe expatriate footballers
São Tomé and Príncipe expatriate sportspeople in Portugal
Expatriate footballers in Portugal
São Tomé and Príncipe expatriate sportspeople in Angola
Expatriate footballers in Angola
Association football midfielders
Association football forwards